Katherina Kubenk (born 11 October 1970) is a Canadian freestyle skier. She was born in Toronto. She competed at the 1994 Winter Olympics in Lillehammer, in women's moguls and women's aerials.

References

External links 
 

1970 births
Living people
Skiers from Toronto
Canadian female freestyle skiers
Olympic freestyle skiers of Canada
Freestyle skiers at the 1994 Winter Olympics